Stimulator may refer to:

 something that provides stimulation

Medicine
Spinal cord stimulator, an implantable neuromodulation device 
Sacral nerve stimulator, for bladder and/or bowel control
Sacral anterior root stimulator
Thalamic stimulator, to suppress tremors
Vagus nerve stimulator, for epilepsy and treatment-resistant depression

Music 
Stimulator (band), an American alternative rock band
The Stimulators, an American punk rock band

Other uses
Stimulator (dry fly), an artificial fly for fishing
Stimulator (gastropod), a genus of mollusc

See also